Upper Main Street Historic District may refer to:

Upper Main Street Historic District (Ansonia, Connecticut)
Upper Main Street Historic District (Lafayette, Indiana)
Upper Main Street Historic District (Dubuque, Iowa)
Upper Main Street Historic District (Hatfield, Massachusetts)
Upper Main Street Historic District (Menasha, Wisconsin), listed on the National Register of Historic Places in Winnebago County, Wisconsin

See also
Main Street Historic District (disambiguation)